John McPhee (born 14 July 1994) is a Scottish Grand Prix motorcycle racer, competing for in the World Supersport Championship for Vince64 by Puccetti Racing.

Previously he raced in the 2022 Moto3 World Championship for Max Biaggi's Sterilgarda Husqvarna team. McPhee is also a former competitor of the British 125GP Championship, and the Spanish 125GP/Moto3 Championship.

Career

Early life
McPhee was born in Oban, Scotland.

Moto3 World Championship

Caretta Technology (2012)
Making his Grand Prix debut in 2012, McPhee entered three rounds, Catalunya, Silverstone, and Brno, as a wildcard rider with the Racing Steps Foundation KRP Honda, fitted with a Honda NSF250R engine. For the final five races, he raced with Caretta Technology, replacing Alexis Masbou who broke his leg in a testing accident. McPhee scored one point in Brno, and earned himself a full-time ride for 2013.

Caretta Technology RTG (2013)
McPhee signed with Caretta Technology RTG for the 2013 season, replacing the Moto2 bound Louis Rossi. He partnered Jack Miller, and was outmatched throughout the whole year. Miller finished in 7th, McPhee finished in 19th, with five point scoring finishes, a season's best of 7th in Japan, and 24 points total.

SaxoPrint-RTG (2014–2015)
Staying with the re-branded SaxoPrint-RTG Honda team for the 2014 season, this time partnered by Efrén Vázquez, McPhee improved, and was a regular points finisher. He scored points in 11 of the 18 rounds that year, with a 4th place in Japan, and 5th in Australia on consecutive weekends being the highlight of the season. McPhee finished 13th in the rider's championship, with 77 points total.

In 2015, McPhee stayed with the Saxoprint RTG team, and was joined by Alexis Masbou. McPhee started the season well, with a 5th place in Qatar, and a 6th place in Austin. The real breakthrough came in round 10, when he took his first podium with a second place at Indianapolis: in a wet-to-dry race, McPhee pitted at the end of the formation lap for slick tyres, and finished almost 40 seconds behind race winner Livio Loi, who had started on slicks.

Peugeot MC Saxoprint (2016)
In 2016 McPhee had a difficult year on the team's new Peugeot bike, which proved uncompetitive in the dry. However, the Scot had several good results in wet conditions: 7th in Argentina, and 6th in Germany, before the race in Brno, where he took the lead after championship leader Brad Binder had crashed out, and despite almost highsiding on the penultimate lap, held on for his first ever Grand Prix victory. Later in the year in Australia, McPhee was running in third place when he lost the front at Lukey Heights on lap 6, and was run over by Andrea Migno and Enea Bastianini, who were running right behind him. The race was red flagged, and John was taken to hospital in Melbourne, where he was diagnosed with a concussion, a broken thumb, and a punctured lung. The injuries meant McPhee spent nearly 2 months in Australia before he was able to fly home to Scotland. He finished the season 22nd in the standings, with 48 total points.

British Talent Team (2017)
McPhee had a successful 2017 riding for the new British Talent Team, starting off with two straight 2nd places in Qatar and Argentina, where he also earned pole position. McPhee scored a 3rd place in Assen later in the year, and ultimately finished the season 7th in the standings, with 131 points.

CIP Green Power (2018)
Following the surprise withdrawal of the British Talent Team from the world championship to focus on junior racing, McPhee spent the 2018 season riding a KTM for the CIP Green Power team. Although he occasionally ran at the front of the pack, including a 4th in Barcelona, a 3rd in Germany, a 5th in Japan, and a 3rd in the season closer at Valencia, the team struggled with a lack of funds, and McPhee regressed back to 12th in the standings, collecting 78 points during the campaign.

Petronas Sprinta Racing (2019–2021)
For 2019 McPhee joined the Petronas Sprinta Racing team, and on a competitive bike, he rediscovered his 2017 form. His season high point came at the French Grand Prix, where from pole position he out duelled eventual world champion Lorenzo Dalla Porta to pick up his second career win. McPhee also had a 2nd place in San Marino, and a 3rd place in Austria, ending the season in a career best 5th place in the championship. 

Despite some speculation about moving up to Moto2, he remained with the team for 2020. The season started well with a 2nd place in Qatar, a 2nd place in Jerez, a 3rd place in Austria, and coming back from 17th on the grid at Misano to claim his third career win, moving him into championship contention. However his form dipped in the second half of the season, and he wound up 7th in the final standings, with 131 points.

The 2021 campaign would start horribly for McPhee and Petronas Racing, as he retired from the first four races of the year, two unfortunate crashes which caught McPhee through no fault of his own, and two unforced individual errors from the Scot. He grabbed a 3rd place finish for his only podium of the year in Austin, but otherwise capped off a disappointing season, down in 13th in the standings, with only 77 points.

Sterilgarda Husqvarna Max (2022)
Following Petronas Racing leaving Moto3, McPhee moved to Max Biaggi's Sterilgarda Husqvarna team, replacing Romano Fenati, who moved up to Moto2. The season started well for McPhee, with a 5th place finish in Qatar.

Moto2 World Championship

Petronas Sprinta Racing (2021)
Franco Morbidelli was unable to ride in the 2021 British motorcycle Grand Prix due to injury, and Brit Jake Dixon was given the opportunity to move up to MotoGP for his home race. McPhee rode Jake Dixon's Moto2 machine at Aragon and finished 20th from the 21 riders that finished the race.

Career statistics

Grand Prix motorcycle racing

By season

By class

Races by year
(key) (Races in bold indicate pole position, races in italics indicate fastest lap)

Supersport World Championship

Races by year
(key) (Races in bold indicate pole position, races in italics indicate fastest lap)

 Season still in progress.

References

External links

 

Living people
1994 births
Scottish motorcycle racers
125cc World Championship riders
Moto3 World Championship riders
People from Oban
Sportspeople from Argyll and Bute
Moto2 World Championship riders
Supersport World Championship riders